Herbert Denys Hake OBE (8 November 1894 – 12 April 1975) was an English cricketer. Hake was a right-handed batsman who played as an occasional wicketkeeper.

As a child Hake was educated at Haileybury and Imperial Service College, where he represented the school in cricket. During the First World War Hake served in the British Armed Forces.

Hake made his first-class debut for Cambridge University against PF Warner's XI in the 1920. The same season Hake made his County Championship debut for Hampshire against Essex.

In 1921 Hake played four first-class matches for Cambridge University, with his final first-class match for the university coming against Warwickshire. Hake did not manage to get his Cambridge Blue. During the 1921 season Hake captained Hampshire in a Championship match against Sussex.

From 1920 to 1925 Hake represented Hampshire in 21 first-class matches, where he scored 478 runs at an average of 17.70, with three half centuries and a high score of 94, which came against Leicestershire in 1921. Hake's final first-class match for Hampshire came in the 1925 County Championship against Essex.

After retiring from first-class cricket Hake served firstly as the headmaster of his childhood school, Haileybury. Later Hake moved to Australia, where he served as the headmaster of The King's School in Parramatta, New South Wales from 1939 to 1964. Hake served as the Chairman of Conference of the Headmasters' Conference of the Independent Schools of Australia. During this time Hake was awarded the Order of the British Empire.

Hake died at Sydney, New South Wales on 12 April 1974.

Family
Hake's uncle Stanley Toyne represented Hampshire and the Marylebone Cricket Club in first-class cricket.

External links
Herbert Hake at Cricinfo
Herbert Hake at CricketArchive
Matches and detailed statistics for Herbert Hake

1894 births
1975 deaths
People from Christchurch, Dorset
Cricketers from Dorset
People educated at Haileybury and Imperial Service College
British Army personnel of World War I
English cricketers
Royal Hampshire Regiment officers
Hampshire cricketers
Cambridge University cricketers
Australian headmasters
Officers of the Order of the British Empire
Chairmen of the Headmasters' Conference of the Independent Schools of Australia